Belfort Castle may refer to:

Belfort Castle (Graubünden) in Switzerland
Beaufort Castle, Lebanon